Vizitiu, meaning "charioteer", is a Romanian surname. Notable people with the surname include:

Ioan Vizitiu (born 1970), Romanian rower
Patricia Vizitiu (born 1988), Romanian handball player

Romanian-language surnames
Occupational surnames